Dysoxylum flavescens is a tree in the family Meliaceae. The specific epithet  is from the Latin meaning "yellowish", referring to the petals.

Description
The bark is brown. The flowers are creamy-yellow. The fruits are reddish orange, roundish, at least  in diameter.

Distribution and habitat
Dysoxylum flavescens is found in Sumatra, Peninsular Malaysia and Borneo. Its habitat is rain forest from sea-level to  altitude.

References

flavescens
Trees of Sumatra
Trees of Peninsular Malaysia
Trees of Borneo
Plants described in 1875